Lax Lake may refer to:

Lax Lake, Minnesota, an unincorporated community
Lax Lake (Minnesota), a lake in Minnesota